Lakki Marwat is a tehsil located in Lakki Marwat District, Khyber Pakhtunkhwa, Pakistan. The population is 579,274 according to the 2017 census.

See also 
 List of tehsils of Khyber Pakhtunkhwa

References 

Tehsils of Khyber Pakhtunkhwa
Populated places in Lakki Marwat District